John Eugene Vedrenne (July 13, 1867-February 12, 1930), often known as J. E. Vedrenne, was a West End theatre producer who co-managed the Savoy Theatre with Harley Granville-Barker, and then (from 1904 to 1907, also with Granville-Barker) the Royal Court Theatre.  During their time at the latter, they premiered several of George Bernard Shaw's plays, including John Bull's Other Island and Major Barbara. His partnership with Granville-Barker ending in 1907, Vedrenne then became associated with Lewis Waller at the Lyric Theatre, and in 1911 with Dennis Eadie at the Royalty Theatre, and later still at the Kingsway Theatre.

Vedrenne's wife was Phyllis Blair.

Notes

External links
https://web.archive.org/web/20150226231821/http://www.brown.edu/Facilities/University_Library/exhibits/shaw/plays.html
George Bernard Shaw By T. F. Evans, p144

1867 births
1930 deaths
British theatre managers and producers